Robin Everardus Gosens (born 5 July 1994) is a German professional footballer who plays as a left midfielder or left-back for  club Inter Milan and the Germany national team.

Club career

Vitesse
Born in Emmerich am Rhein, Gosens appeared for local clubs such as Fortuna Elten, 1. FC Bocholt and VfL Rhede, before joining Vitesse's youth setup on 4 July 2012. On 13 August 2013, he signed his first professional deal with the club. Prior to this, he failed at a trial workout with Bundesliga giant Borussia Dortmund. Gosens himself described it a fiasco.

FC Dordrecht (loan)
On 14 January 2014, Gosens was loaned to FC Dordrecht until the end of the season. He made his professional debut three days later, starting in a 1–1 home draw against SBV Excelsior.

Gosens scored his first professional goal on 7 February, netting the second in a 6–1 home victory against FC Emmen. He appeared in 20 matches during the campaign (play-offs included), as his side finished second and returned to Eredivisie after a nineteen-year absence.

On 29 May 2014, Gosens' loan was renewed for a further year, and he made his Eredivisie debut on 9 August, playing the full 90 minutes in a 2–1 away win against SC Heerenveen. He scored his first goal in the competition on 20 September, netting his side's only in a 1–1 away draw against Excelsior.

Heracles Almelo
On 4 June 2015, it was announced that Gosens had moved on a free transfer to Heracles Almelo.

Atalanta
On 2 June 2017, it was announced that Gosens had transferred to Italian side Atalanta. On 18 September 2019, Gosens made his Champions League debut against Dinamo Zagreb. On 11 December 2019, he scored his first Champions League goal in a 3–0 away win over Shakhtar Donetsk. On 25 November 2020, he scored his second Champions League goal in a 2–0 away win over Liverpool at Anfield.

Gosens established himself as one of the top wing-backs in the Serie A, excelling both offensively and defensively. During the 2019–20 and 2020–21 seasons, he was one of Atalanta's top goalscorers of the season scoring 10 goals and 12 goals, unprecedentedly high numbers for a defender. On 14 September 2021, he scored the equalizing goal for Atalanta in a 2–2 away draw against Villarreal in the first fixture of the 2021–22 Champions League season.

Inter Milan
On 27 January 2022, Inter Milan announced the signing of Gosens on a loan until the end of the season, with an obligation to buy if certain conditions are met. On 12 October 2022, he scored his first Champions League goal with Inter in a 3–3 away draw against Barcelona at Camp Nou.

International career
On 25 August 2020, Gosens received his first call-up to represent the Germany national football team. He made his debut on 3 September, starting in the 2020–21 UEFA Nations League match against Spain.

On 19 May 2021, he was included in the UEFA Euro 2020 squad. On 19 June 2021, he scored a goal and provided an assist in a 4–2 win over Portugal in a group stage game at the tournament, for which he was awarded the Star of the Match.

Personal life
Gosens was born in Germany to a German mother and a Dutch father, and holds both Dutch and German passports.

Career statistics

Club

International

Scores and results list Germany's goal tally first.

Honours
Inter Milan
Coppa Italia: 2021–22
Supercoppa Italiana: 2022

Individual
Serie A Team of the Year: 2019–20

References

External links

 Profile at the Inter Milan website
 
 

1994 births
Living people
People from Emmerich am Rhein
Sportspeople from Düsseldorf (region)
German people of Dutch descent 
German footballers
Footballers from North Rhine-Westphalia
Association football fullbacks
Association football midfielders
Germany international footballers
UEFA Euro 2020 players
Eredivisie players
Eerste Divisie players
Serie A players
SBV Vitesse players
FC Dordrecht players
Heracles Almelo players
Atalanta B.C. players
Inter Milan players
German expatriate footballers
German expatriate sportspeople in Italy
Expatriate footballers in Italy